Don Robertson may refer to:

 Don Robertson (author) (1929–1999), American novelist
 Don Robertson (baseball) (born 1930), former Major League Baseball player
 Don Robertson (composer) (born 1942), American composer
 Don Robertson (golfer), 1987 and 1988 winner of the Northern Texas PGA Championship
 Don Robertson (songwriter) (1922–2015), American songwriter and pianist
 Don Robertson (referee) (born 1987), Association football referee
 Don Robertson (television announcer) (born 1926), retired American television announcer

See also
 Donald Robertson (disambiguation)